Larón (Ḷḷarón in asturian) is one of 54 parish councils in Cangas del Narcea, a municipality within the province and autonomous community of Asturias, in northern Spain.

Villages
 Ḷḷarón
 La Vilieḷḷa

References

Parishes in Cangas del Narcea